Democratic Association may refer to:
Central Democratic Association
London Democratic Association